Kenneth Sim (born October 18, 1970) is a Canadian politician and businessman who has served as the 41st mayor of Vancouver since 2022.

Biography
Born in Vancouver, Sim attended Magee Secondary School, Sir Winston Churchill Secondary School, and the UBC Sauder School of Business, graduating with a BComm in finance in 1993. He also holds a FCPA and FCA accounting designation.

Sim co-founded Nurse Next Door Home Healthcare Services in 2001.

Mayor of Vancouver
Sim first ran for mayor with the Non-Partisan Association in the 2018 Vancouver municipal election and finished the runner-up to Kennedy Stewart.

Sim was elected mayor of Vancouver, running under the ABC Vancouver party banner, on October 15, 2022. He is the first challenger to defeat a sitting mayor of Vancouver since 1980, when Mike Harcourt upset incumbent Jack Volrich. Sim is the first Chinese Canadian mayor of Vancouver.

In 2023, the Globe and Mail published allegations from an anonymous CSIS source claiming that China interfered in the 2022 Vancouver municipal election. Sim has denied the allegations.

Personal life
Sim resides in Kitsilano with his wife and their four sons. He has said that his children not seeing "a future for themselves in Vancouver" was a primary reason why he wanted to go into politics.

Sim has attended educational events held by Landmark Education group, described by some as a large group awareness training cult.

Electoral record

References 

1970 births
Living people
21st-century Canadian politicians
Businesspeople from Vancouver
Canadian politicians of Chinese descent
Mayors of Vancouver
UBC Sauder School of Business alumni